USU or Usu may refer to: 
 Universal Student Unionism (Australia)
 Usu (mortar), a Japanese mortar

Science and Technology
 Unseptunium, a hypothetical chemical element with symbol Usu

Universities 
 Universidade Santa Úrsula (Brazil)
 Utah State University (Logan, Utah)
 Ulyanovsk State University (Ulyanovsk, Russia)
 Uniformed Services University
 University of Sydney Union
 Ural State University aka Ural A.M. Gorky State University (Russia)
 United States University
 Uttarakhand Sanskrit University, a state university in Uttarakhand, India
 University of North Sumatra in Medan, Indonesia

Places 
 Mount Usu, a volcanic mountain in Hokkaido, Japan
 Ushu, a mainland city that supplied the city of Tyre, called in the Amarna Letters Usu
 Wusu, a city in Xinjiang, China
 Francisco B. Reyes Airport, serving Coron and Busuanga Island, Palawan Province, Philippines (IATA code USU)

Computers 
 USU Software, a German software and IT business
 USU (operating system), a Bulgarian linux distribution